Bustillo may refer to:

Places 
Bustillo de Chaves, municipality in the province of Valladolid, Spain
Bustillo del Oro, municipality in the province of Zamora, Spain
Bustillo del Páramo de Carrión, place in the province of Palencia, Spain
Bustillo de la Vega, municipality in the province of Palencia, Spain
Rafael Bustillo, a Bolivian province in the Potosí Department

People 
Alejandro Bustillo (1889–1982), Argentine architect
Encarnación Bustillo Salomón (1876 – c. 1960), Spanish painter
Exequiel Bustillo (1893–1973), Argentine lawyer, brother of Alejandro Bustillo
Francisco Bustillo (born 1960), Uruguayan diplomat
José María Bustillo (Honduran) (died 1855), military and politician
Richard Bustillo (1942–2017), Filipino-American martial arts instructor from Hawaii
Miguel Ángel Bustillo (1946–2016), Spanish footballer